Aspidimorpha dorsata, is a species of leaf beetle widely distributed in South Asia and South East Asia.

Description
Body length is about 8 to 10 mm. Body sub-circular. Two variations can occur as continental morph and insular morph. Insular populations lack a humeral spot on the elytral explanate margin. There are dark markings on the disc of the elytra. The continental populations have the humeral spot. Elytral disc is uniformly yellow.

References 

Cassidinae
Insects of Sri Lanka
Beetles described in 1787